2MASS J18450079–1409036 and 2MASS J18450097–1409053 is a system of two red dwarf stars both of which have spectral types of M5, with projected separation of 3.2 seconds of arc. The system is located in the constellation Scutum. The Gaia  parallaxes place the system at 18.2 parsecs (59 light-years) from Earth. Kinematically, it belongs to young (30-50 million years) Argus association.

Proper motion
2MASS J18450079–1409036 and 2MASS J18450097-1409053 appear to be a common proper motion pair, confirmed to be bound in 2016.

References

Scutum (constellation)
Binary stars
M-type main-sequence stars
J18450079–1409036